Shamsuzzoha Khan is a Bangladesh Nationalist Party politician and the former Member of Parliament from Naogaon-2.

Career
Khan was elected to parliament in 1996 from Naogaon-2 as a candidate of Bangladesh Nationalist Party. He was reelected from Naogaon-2 in 2001. Following the 2004 Dhaka grenade attack on a rally of Sheikh Hasina he blamed Bangladesh Awami League. In 2009 he was named the Joint Convenor of Naogaon District unit of Bangladesh Nationalist Party.

References

Bangladesh Nationalist Party politicians
Living people
8th Jatiya Sangsad members
6th Jatiya Sangsad members
7th Jatiya Sangsad members
Year of birth missing (living people)
People from Naogaon District